Kachari may refer to:
Of or relating to the Cachar district, Assam in India
Kachari Kingdom, a former kingdom in Assam, India
Bodo-Kachari peoples, a number of ethnic groups in Assam, India
Kachari language, Tibeto-Burman language of Assam, India

See also

Kachari Ruins, in Dimapur, Nagaland, India

Language and nationality disambiguation pages